Chester Leland Brewer (November 26, 1875 – April 16, 1953) was an American football, basketball, baseball, and track and field coach and athletic director. He served as the head football coach at Albion College (1899–1902), Michigan Agricultural College—now known as Michigan State University (1903–1910, 1917, 1919), the University of Missouri (1911–1913), and the Northern Branch of the College of Agriculture—now known as the University of California, Davis (1922), compiling a career record of 97–51–4. Brewer was also the head basketball coach at Michigan Agricultural (1903–1910), Missouri (1910–1911) and Northern Branch (1922–1923), tallying a mark of 84–36, and the head baseball coach at Michigan Agricultural (1904–1910, 1918–1920) and Missouri (1911, 1914–1917, 1933–1934), amassing a record of 148–93–4.

Coaching career
From 1903 to 1910, and in 1917 and 1919, Brewer coached football at Michigan Agricultural College, where he compiled a 58–23–7 record, making him one of the school's most prolific coaches.

From 1911 to 1913, he coached football at the University of Missouri, where he compiled a 14–8–2 record. During his years at the Missouri, Brewer fulfilled many roles. He was hired as athletic director in 1910 and wasted little time in leaving his mark at the university, as he was one of the founding members of the M Men's Club. He founded the club on the eve of the 1911 football game against Kansas, and the organization became the sponsor for intramural sports championships at the university. Brewer was also the coach of the 1911 baseball team, which had an 8–3 record. He assumed the leadership of the baseball team a second time from 1914 to 1917 and achieved a 49–15–3 record. He remained at the Missouri until 1917 and at different periods also coached basketball and track. Brewer is also credited with beginning the homecoming tradition at the University of Missouri and the entire nation with the 1911 Kansas vs. Missouri football game.

Brewer left Missouri at the end of the 1917 school year to serve in World War I. He spent the next year directing training camp activities at universities around the country. He returned to Michigan Agricultural College after the war. In 1922, he coached football at the Northern Branch of the College of Agriculture in Davis, California, where he compiled a 3–4–2 record.

Brewer returned to Missouri in 1923 and was named athletic director and a professor of physical education. His second tenure as athletic director lasted until 1935. During these twelve years of leadership, he helped oversee the construction of Brewer Fieldhouse, which was named for him on February 8, 1930. Brewer also coached the Missouri Tigers baseball team one final time from 1933 to 1934 and finished with a 12–17 record. His final record as Missouri's baseball coach was 69–32–3.

Later life and death
Brewer remained with the university as a professor until his death. He died on April 16, 1953, at the age of 77 in Columbia, Missouri.

Head coaching record

Football

See also
 List of college football head coaches with non-consecutive tenure

References

External links
 

1875 births
1953 deaths
Albion Britons football coaches
Basketball coaches from Michigan
American military personnel of World War I
Michigan State Spartans athletic directors
Michigan State Spartans baseball coaches
Michigan State Spartans football coaches
Michigan State Spartans men's basketball coaches
Missouri Tigers athletic directors
Missouri Tigers baseball coaches
Missouri Tigers football coaches
Missouri Tigers men's basketball coaches
UC Davis Aggies football coaches
UC Davis Aggies men's basketball coaches
Wisconsin Badgers football players
Wisconsin–Whitewater Warhawks football coaches
College men's basketball head coaches in the United States
Missouri Tigers track and field coaches
Michigan State University faculty
University of Missouri faculty
Burials at Memorial Park Cemetery (Columbia, Missouri)
Coaches of American football from Michigan
Baseball coaches from Michigan